Beth Sanner is an American government official, currently serving as the Deputy Director of National Intelligence for Mission Integration. She was appointed to the position in May 2019.

Prior to this, Sanner assumed leadership for the President's Daily Brief in April 2017. Previously she served as the Vice Chair of the National Intelligence Council.

For over 30 years, Sanner has served in a wide range of leadership, staff, policy, and analytic positions in the Office of the Director of National Intelligence, the Central Intelligence Agency, the National Security Council, and the U.S. Department of State. Prior to joining the NIC, Sanner held several senior leadership positions in CIA's Directorate of Analysis, including leading the analytic effort on South Asia and serving as the deputy for analysis for Russian and European affairs. She also held analytic leadership roles for the Balkans, Central Europe, and Southeast Asia. Sanner was the Director of the Career Analyst Program, the training program for all new CIA analysts.

Sanner is a Distinguished Graduate of the National War College, earning a Master of Science in National Security Strategy. She has a B.A. in Economics and International Affairs from the American University.

References

American University alumni
Living people
National War College alumni
Trump administration personnel
Year of birth missing (living people)
Place of birth missing (living people)
United States National Security Council staffers
United States Department of State officials
Analysts of the Central Intelligence Agency
American women civil servants
21st-century American women